Hélio Fernando Xavier Vieira (born 3 September 1963), known as Hélio Vieira, is a Brazilian football manager and former player who played as a central defender.

Playing career
Vieira was born in Pelotas, Rio Grande do Sul, and was a Brasil de Pelotas youth graduate. After making his first team debut at the age of 16, he would become a regular starter for the club in the following years.

Vieira subsequently represented Juventude, Guarany de Camaquã, Guarany de Bagé, São Paulo-RS and Esportivo, retiring with the latter in 1997 at the age of 33.

Managerial career
Immediately after retiring, Vieira returned to his first club Brasil de Pelotas, being appointed manager in the place of sacked Vacaria. He left the club in the following year, and worked at São José-RS.

Vieira continued to work mainly in his native state in the following years, being in charge of Santa Cruz-RS (six times, where one of them he did not manage the club for a single match due to accepting an offer from a Saudi club), Caixas, Veranópolis (four times), Farroupilha, Glória, Esportivo (two times), Avenida (four times), Cerâmica, Aimoré (two times), São Paulo-RS, Ypiranga-RS and Passo Fundo, also with a return to Brasil de Pelotas in 2011. He also worked in Santa Catarina with Atlético Tubarão (three times) and Brusque (two times), and also worked abroad with Saudi Arabian sides Al-Riyadh and Al-Watani.

On 26 March 2021, Vieira returned to São José in the place of Carlos Moraes.

References

External links

1963 births
Living people
People from Pelotas
Brazilian footballers
Association football defenders
Campeonato Brasileiro Série A players
Grêmio Esportivo Brasil players
Esporte Clube Juventude players
Guarany Futebol Clube players
Sport Club São Paulo players
Clube Esportivo Bento Gonçalves players
Brazilian football managers
Grêmio Esportivo Brasil managers
Esporte Clube São José managers
Futebol Clube Santa Cruz managers
Sociedade Esportiva e Recreativa Caxias do Sul managers
Veranópolis Esporte Clube Recreativo e Cultural managers
Grêmio Esportivo Glória managers
Clube Esportivo Bento Gonçalves managers
Esporte Clube Avenida managers
Sport Club São Paulo managers
Clube Esportivo Aimoré managers
Ypiranga Futebol Clube managers
Esporte Clube Passo Fundo managers
Al-Riyadh SC managers
Saudi Professional League managers
Brazilian expatriate sportspeople in Saudi Arabia
Expatriate football managers in Saudi Arabia
Sportspeople from Rio Grande do Sul